Adam Karol Benisz (November 10, 1888, in Nowy Sacz – 1991 in Nowy Sącz) was an officer for the Polish army and an insurgent Silesian. He studied law at the Jagiellonian University in Krakow.

In 1921, during the Third Silesian Uprising, he was a tactical officer in the Regiment Katowice. He later became commander of the garrison in Kedzierzyn, and was put in charge of the defense of the city during the fighting with the Germans. In 1941, he became a soldier of the Polish Armed Forces.

He died on January 24, 1991, in Nowy Sącz.

Books

He was the author of these books about the Silesian Uprisings:
 Upper Silesia in the struggle for Polish (1930)
 Fight for Kedzierzyn and Mount St Anny (1961) 
 In the Storm of Life (1976)

Awards 
  Order of Polonia Restituta

See also
Józef Piłsudski
Poland

References

Sources 
 
 

1888 births
1991 deaths
Polish non-fiction writers
Polish male non-fiction writers
Polish soldiers
20th-century non-fiction writers